The Papuan seerfish (Scomberomorus multiradiatus) also called the Papuan Spanish mackerel,  is a species of fish in the family Scombridae. It is endemic to the Gulf of Papua off the mouth of the Fly River. It is the smallest species in the genus Scomberomorus. Sexual maturity is attained at much less than 30 cm fork length.

References
 

Scombridae
Fish of New Guinea
Taxa named by Ian Stafford Ross Munro
Fish described in 1964
Scomberomorus